Eduardo Landazury (born 17 April 1966) is a Colombian judoka. He competed in the men's half-lightweight event at the 1988 Summer Olympics.

References

1966 births
Living people
Colombian male judoka
Olympic judoka of Colombia
Judoka at the 1988 Summer Olympics
Place of birth missing (living people)
Pan American Games medalists in judo
Pan American Games bronze medalists for Colombia
Judoka at the 1987 Pan American Games
Medalists at the 1987 Pan American Games
20th-century Colombian people